USNS Amelia Earhart (T-AKE-6), a Lewis and Clark-class dry cargo ship is the only ship of the United States Navy to be named for noted American aviation pioneer and women's rights advocate Amelia Earhart (1897–1937). The contract to build the ship was awarded to National Steel and Shipbuilding Company (NASSCO) of San Diego, California, on 27 January 2004. Her keel was laid down at the end of May 2007 at General Dynamics' NASSCO shipyard.  In early 2007, Alex Mandel along with members of the Amelia Earhart Society (AES) and Amelia Earhart Research Association (AERA) successfully petitioned the naming of the ship.

On 26 July 2007 one of the ship's four 200-ton diesel-electric engines toppled from a truck delivering it to the shipyard in the 2700 block of Harbor Drive, San Diego.  The engine damaged three vehicles, completely flattening one. A woman sleeping in the back of a van whose front-end was destroyed suffered minor injuries.  The accident also created an  sink-hole in the roadway and ruptured a water main. The accident is believed to have been caused when the truck accidentally delivered the engine to the wrong gate of the shipyard and hit the curb while backing up in an attempt to turn around.  The engine was recovered on 29 July by three heavy cranes.

At 9 p.m. 6 April 2008, a ceremony was held to christen the Amelia Earhart, with the honors of breaking the traditional bottle of champagne given to Amelia Earhart's closest living relative, niece Amy Kleppner. Ms. Kleppner is also sister-in-law of physicist Daniel Kleppner, whose wife Beatrice and daughter Sofie participated as Matrons of Honor. The new ship is designed to deliver ammunition, food, fuel and other dry cargo to US and allied warships at sea. It will be crewed by 124 civil service mariners and, at times, will include an additional complement of naval personnel and carry two helicopters.

On 20 November 2014 the Amelia Earhart collided with the USNS Walter S. Diehl in the Gulf of Aden.

References

External links

 

Lewis and Clark-class dry cargo ships
Ships built in San Diego
2008 ships